Persatuan Sepakbola Mataram is an Indonesian football club based in Mataram, Lombok, West Nusa Tenggara. They currently compete in the Liga 3.

References

External links
Liga-Indonesia.co.id
 

Lombok
Football clubs in Indonesia
Football clubs in West Nusa Tenggara